Bernard Enrique Witte (July 27, 1926 – February 21, 2015) was a Roman Catholic bishop.

Born in Vardingholt, Rhede, Germany, Witte was ordained to the priesthood in 1954. In 1977, he was appointed bishop of the Roman Catholic Diocese of La Rioja, Argentina, and in 1992 was appointed bishop of the Roman Catholic Diocese of Concepción retiring in 2001.

Notes

1926 births
2015 deaths
20th-century Roman Catholic bishops in Argentina
People from Rhede
Missionary Oblates of Mary Immaculate
20th-century German Roman Catholic priests
Roman Catholic bishops of Concepción, Argentina